Tune In, Turn On (subtitled To the Hippest Commercials of the Sixties) is an album by Benny Golson featuring music from television advertisements recorded in 1967 and released on the Verve label.

Reception

The Allmusic review states, "the kind of release that serious jazz listeners loathed. For sheer enjoyment, however, one can raise the rating by better than half-it is fun even if it isn't remotely the best jazz, or jazz at all".

Track listing
 "Music to Watch Girls By" (Sid Ramin) - 2:54    
 "Wink" (Paul Murphy) - 2:42    
 "The Dis-Advantages of You" (Mitch Leigh) - 2:19    
 "No Matter What Shape (Your Stomach's In)" (Granville "Sascha" Burland) - 2:21    
 "Right Any Time of the Day" (John Fox, Barry Ballister) - 2:32    
 "Music to Think By" (Richard Boyell) - 2:35    
 "The Swinger" (Mitch Leigh) - 2:35    
 "The Magnificent Seven" (Elmer Bernstein) - 2:49    
 "Cool Whip" (Roy Eaton) - 2:35    
 "The Golden Glow" (Benny Golson) - 2:10    
 "Fried Bananas" (Gary McFarland) - 2:57    
 "Happiness Is" (Paul Evans, Paul Parnes) - 2:29

Personnel
Benny Golson - arranger, tenor saxophone
Art Farmer - trumpet, flugelhorn
Richard Tee - piano
Eric Gale - guitar
Jimmy Tyrell - bass
Bernard Purdie - drums
Warren Smith - percussion
Other unnamed musicians

References 

Verve Records albums
Benny Golson albums
1967 albums
Albums produced by Tom Wilson (record producer)
Instrumental albums